The United States federal legislation called the Timber Export Act of March 4, 1917 gave the world War I Allies of the United States preference in government regulated timber exports.  It made little practical difference in the end, as most timber cut was used for U.S. military supply purposes at home.

1917 in American law
United States federal legislation
World War I